Lucy Meyle is a New Zealand multidisciplinary artist. Her work includes drawing, print-making, painting, poetry, comics and zines. Her comics feature in the New Zealand comics Anthology Three Words.

Education 
Meyle holds a Masters of Art and Design from Auckland University of Technology. Her masters thesis was entitled No Longer/Not Yet: lacuna and dissemination in practice. In 2018 Meyle was awarded a PhD from the Auckland University of Technology. Her doctoral thesis was titled Does a Flower Rehearse for Spring?. From April 2020 Meyle has been employed as a lecturer in Art and Design at the Auckland University of Technology.

Awards 
Auckland Zinefest Best in the Fest (2013)
British School at Rome Wallace New Zealand Residence Award (2018)

Exhibitions 
Looking forwards and backwards by Meyle and Ziggy Lever, Blue Oyster Art Project Space, Dunedin.
Wallace Art Awards Exhibition of Winners and Travelling Finalists, September 2018 - November 2019
March Mostra, British School at Rome, 16–23 March 2019.
Auckland Art Fair, 24–28 February 2021.

References

External links 
Meyle's website

Living people
New Zealand comics artists
New Zealand artists
New Zealand poets
New Zealand female comics artists
Year of birth missing (living people)
Auckland University of Technology alumni